Nitin Rakesh, an Indian-American businessman, author, and philanthropist, is currently the Chief Executive Officer and Director of Mphasis. Prior to that, Rakesh was Syntel's CEO and President, as well as CEO and Managing Director of Motilal Oswal Asset Management Company Ltd., and as Chief Executive of State Street Syntel Services, a joint venture between Syntel and State Street Bank.

Early life and education

Rakesh grew up in a small town on the outskirts of New Delhi and was active in sports and athletics. In high school, he was a Quiz master as well as an active member in student leadership. He completed his schooling from Apeejay School, Faridabad and St. Joseph's Convent, graduating in 1989.

He moved to Delhi to earn his Bachelor of Engineering degree in Computer Science from Delhi Institute of Technology DIT (now Netaji Subhas University of Technology NSUT). Rakesh completed his Master's in Management Studies from SVKM's NMIMS, Mumbai in 1995. He is an alumnus of Harvard Business School's CEO Workshop.

Career

In his early career, Rakesh worked for Unit Trust of India, setting up offshore mutual funds and a secondary Market Research Cell, Product Development and Risk Management. He also worked with TCG Group, a transnational private equity and investments firm as the Head of Banking & Financial Services Sales at TCG Software Services.

From 2002 to 2008, Rakesh was employed at Syntel in various capacities. During his tenure, he founded Syntel's Business Process Outsourcing practice, building it into a significant contributor to Syntel's overall revenue. He was named Vice President and Head of B&FS BPO Operations at Syntel in February 2006. He was promoted to Chief Executive Officer of Syntel's joint venture, State Street Syntel Services, where he led its India operations until 2008.

In September 2008, he was named CEO and Managing Director of Motilal Oswal Asset Management Company Ltd., a financial services company that specializes in exchange-traded funds (ETF) and separate accounts. During Rakesh's tenure, the company was named "Most Innovative ETF, Asia Pacific" at the 2011 ETF Awards in New York, and the "Most Innovative Mutual Fund, India" in 2010 at the CRISIL - S&P Mutual Fund Awards.

In September, 2012, he left Motilal Oswal to become President, Americas for Syntel, where he managed Business Development and Nearshoring Center for Syntel's North American operations.

He was named CEO and President of Syntel, in April 2014. He resigned Syntel on 4 November 2016 officially.

Mphasis 

Rakesh was named CEO and Executive Director Mphasis on 29 January 2017. He took over from Ganesh Ayyar.

In the first year of taking on the mantle as the CEO of Mphasis, he introduced Mphasis’ C= X2C2 =1 TM formula for success, (hyper-personalization; drive n=1 powered by Cloud & Cognitive); driving multi-dimensions of business value with an integrated consumer-centric Front to Back Digital Transformation TM, enabling Business Operations, Technology Transformation and Service Transformation, driven by IP assets. Under Nitin's leadership, Mphasis set a record for the highest new deal wins in the history of the company, thus re-defining benchmarks and growing above industry rate.

Early 2017, Rakesh was instrumental in the setting up of Mphasis Sparkles, an innovation lab, that offers startups a platform to showcase innovative solutions to large enterprises and incorporate such products into Mphasis solutions.

Works/Publications
Nitin Rakesh has authored a book “Transformation in Times of Crisis – Eight Principles for Creating Opportunities and Value in the Post-Pandemic World.” with Jerry Wind, an internationally renowned and award-winning academician and the Lauder Professor Emeritus and Professor of Marketing at the Wharton School, University of Pennsylvania. The book was launched virtually on 3 December 2020 and outlines 8 principles businesses can use to make the most of opportunities in the midst of crisis. The book was dedicated to the COVID-19 heroes and proceeds from the sales went to Doctors with Borders and the Mphasis F1 Foundation.

Awards and recognition

 Bronze Stevie Award for “Tech Innovator of the Year” in May 2021 by the Annual American Business Awards® 2021
 Silver Stevie Award as Best Business Book - Transformation in Times of Crisis in May 2021 by the Annual American Business Awards®
 International Business Book of the year 2021 - Transformation in Times of Crisis in May 2021 by the Business Book Awards.
 Gold Stevie Award for Tech Innovator of the Year – Services in May 2019 by the American Business Awards & International Business Awards 2019
 Gold Stevie Award for Executive of the Year - Computer Services in May 2018 by the International Business Awards 2018, under the Management award category.
‘2018 Outstanding 50 Asian Americans in Business’ Award by the Asian American Business Development Center (AABDC)

Boards and Committees
Rakesh is an active member of various institutions globally, such as: 
US – India Strategic Partnership Forum (USISPF) driving financial services council and business relations between US and India 
NASSCOM as Executive Council and Chair of the IT Services Council, charted to future proof IT services industry 
Knowledge@Wharton, The Wharton School, University of Pennsylvania's advisory board, driving digital transformation discussions at grass root level 
Wall Street Journal (WSJ) CEO Council, to debate and formulate strategies to address the biggest issues facing global business and leadership 
Forbes Technology Council (FTC) as an industry expert and practitioner to advise Forbes’ readers globally on current as well as future technologies and trends. 
Ashoka University as a Trustee focusing on multidisciplinary liberal education.
Plaksha University as a Founder and Trustee.

Personal life
Nitin and his family live in New York. He is an avid reader and Yuval Noah Harari in one of his favourite authors. His other interests also include tennis, cricket, vintage bikes, and automobiles.

References

External links 
 Challenges for new Mphasis CEO BTVI
 Industry has much deeper capabilities, says Nitin Rakesh, CEO, Mphasis The Economic Times

Businesspeople from Delhi
People from New Delhi
Living people
Apeejay School alumni
Year of birth missing (living people)